The Rubiales Oil Field is an oil field located in the Llanos Basin, Meta Department, Colombia. It was discovered in 1981 and was first developed, operated and owned by Pacific Rubiales Energy. The field produces heavy oil (11.3-14.5° API) from the C7 unit of the Carbonera Formation. The porosity of the reservoir formation is between 28 and 33% and the permeability ranges from 3 to 5 Darcies. In 2008, 22.817.163 barrels were produced from the field.

Change of operator 
Since July 1, 2016, the field is operated by Ecopetrol. It is the most productive field of the country.

References

Bibliography 
 
 
 

Oil fields of Colombia
Geography of Meta Department